Six vessels of the United States Navy have been named Augusta. The first two, as well as the fourth, were named after the city of Augusta, Georgia, while the fifth and sixth after Augusta, Maine. The third, (SP-946) has not yet been determined which city she was named for.

 , was a 14-gun brig in use from 1799 to 1801.
 , was built in 1853, purchased by the Navy in 1861 and sold in 1868.
 , was a wooden-hulled steam yacht, acquired by the Navy in 1917 and returned to her original owner in 1918.
 , was in service from 1931 to 1946.
 , was a Los Angeles-class nuclear attack submarine, commissioned in 1985 and decommissioned in 2008.
 , an Independence-class littoral combat ship, authorized for construction in 2019.

Sources

United States Navy ship names